The Backs is a picturesque area to the east of Queen's Road in the city of Cambridge, England, where several colleges of the University of Cambridge back on to the River Cam with their grounds covering both banks of the river.

National Trust chairman Simon Jenkins has rated the view of The Backs and King's College as one of the top ten in England.

The name

The Backs refers to the backs of the colleges. The area consists of the rear grounds of the following colleges (north to south):

St John's — buildings on both sides of the river, spanned by the St John's kitchen bridge and the Bridge of Sighs
Trinity — buildings on the east bank, spanned by Trinity bridge.
Trinity Hall — buildings on the east bank but with no rear grounds on the west bank.
Clare — buildings on the east bank, spanned by Clare bridge.
King's — buildings on the east bank, spanned by King's bridge.
Queens' — buildings on both sides of the river, spanned by the Mathematical Bridge.

Sometimes included in The Backs are the following colleges:

Magdalene — grounds on the west bank just south of the Magdalene Street Bridge.
Darwin — just beyond Silver Street at the southern end of The Backs.

Historically, much of the land was used by the colleges for grazing livestock or growing fruit. Cattle can still be found grazing behind King's College. The river was also an important commercial thoroughfare to the mill at Silver Street.

History
In the 16th century, the area consisted of pasture, gardens and orchards owned by colleges of the University, with wooden bridges across the River Cam. The colleges ultimately planted avenues of trees and built sturdier bridges. In 1772, St John's College consulted English landscape architect Lancelot ("Capability") Brown (1716–1783), who laid out a "wilderness" on the college side of Queen's Road which still exists today.

In 1779, Brown presented a plan to the University of Cambridge to create country-house style parkland with its focus on King's College's Gibbs Building. The plan would have involved removing avenues, transforming the river into a lake, and planting clumps of trees to screen the other colleges. It was never implemented, possibly because it would have removed historic college boundaries and three important bridges.

In response to many elm trees succumbing to Dutch elm disease, a Backs Committee was formed in 1979 so that a joint approach could be taken to the problem facing The Backs. As a result of the committee's work, trees were cut down and new ones planted in their place. However, the committee stopped meeting in 1994.

In 1995, English Heritage listed The Backs as a Grade 1 Historic Park.

Present-day and future development
In the 2000s, six University of Cambridge colleges on The Backs commissioned Robert Myers, a landscape architect who had studied at Girton College, to prepare a new landscape management plan for the area. The report, entitled The Backs Cambridge Landscape Strategy, was completed in November 2007 and released on 1 December 2007. It sets out proposals for the evolution of The Backs over the next 50 years. Myers' proposal is to improve the "legibility, coherence and visual quality of the landscape as a whole" by retaining and enhancing the existing structure of the landscape and sight lines, while screening off the traffic on Queens Road. Over-mature and inappropriately-sited trees will be removed and new ones planted. In addition, there will be a phased replacement of avenues, an extension of the "wilderness" planting behind St John's and along the edge of Queens Road, and the creation of a "wildlife corridor". In particular, as regards Queens' Green at the southern end of The Backs, which is owned by Cambridge City Council, there is a proposal to extend an existing avenue of beech trees to the Queens Road to create an additional "rung" to the "ladder effect" created by other tree avenues, and to plant more trees and wilderness to partly enclose a stretch of grass.

The colleges are currently in consultation with the City Council and English Heritage regarding the report, and if it is approved will carry out the suggested work in their own time using their own funds. 

In December 2007, The Daily Telegraph reported that "there has been a remarkable degree of consensus between institutions [i.e., the colleges of the University owning parts of The Backs] well known for prizing their autonomy".

Gallery

See also
 List of bridges in Cambridge
 Punt (boat)

Notes

References

Further reading

Articles
.

Books and papers

External links
Map of the University of Cambridge

Gardens by Capability Brown
Geography of Cambridge
History of Cambridge
Parks and open spaces in Cambridge
River Cam
University of Cambridge sites